Swiss Creek flows into the Black River near Naumburg, New York.

References

Rivers of Lewis County, New York